FZS may refer to:
 Fellow of the Zoological Society of London
 Fort Zumwalt South High School, in Missouri, United States
 Frankfurt Zoological Society, in Germany

See also 
 FZ (disambiguation)